2021 United Kingdom fuel crisis may refer to:

2021 United Kingdom natural gas supplier crisis
2021 United Kingdom fuel supply crisis